Hugo Wolfram (1925 – 15 September 2015) was an English businessman and novelist, of German Jewish origin. He served as managing director of the Lurex Company, makers of the fabric Lurex, and was the author of three novels including Into a Neutral Country, a psychological novel about the experience of refugees and the predicament of "displaced persons".

Biography
Hugo Wolfram was born in Germany, emigrating to England in 1933. When World War II broke out, young Hugo left school at 15 and subsequently found it hard to get a job since he was an enemy alien. As an adult, he took correspondence courses in philosophy and psychology.

References

1925 births
2015 deaths
British chief executives
German chief executives
German male novelists
German people of Hungarian-Jewish descent
Jewish German writers
Jewish emigrants from Nazi Germany to the United Kingdom